Comedy is a double album recorded by Paul Kelly & the Messengers and originally released in 1991. It peaked at No. 12 on the ARIA Albums Chart and remained in the top 50 for 12 weeks. Comedy reached the top 30 on the New Zealand Albums Chart.

It was released via Mushroom Records in Australia and New Zealand, and via Doctor Dream Records in the United States. Track 9, "Take Your Time" is used in the 1997 Australian comedy feature film, The Castle. This was the last album released before the partnership of Kelly & the Messengers was dissolved.

Track listing

All songs written by Paul Kelly, except where noted.

 "Don't Start Me Talking" – 3:30
 "Stories of Me" – 2:56
 "Winter Coat" – 3:58
 "It's All Downhill from Here" – 3:03
 "Leaving Her for the Last Time" (Steve Connolly) – 2:10
 "Brighter" – 4:25
 "Your Litter Sister (Is a Big Girl Now)" – 3:02
 "I Won't Be Your Dog Anymore" – 5:40
 "Take Your Time" – 2:32
 "Sydney from a 727" – 2:46
 "Buffalo Ballet" (John Cale) – 3:52
 "I Can't Believe We Were Married" – 2:30
 "From Little Things Big Things Grow" (Paul Kelly, Kev Carmody) – 6:51
 "Blue Stranger" – 3:04
 "Keep It to Yourself" – 3:50
 "(You Can Put Your) Shoes Under My Bed" – 3:31
 "Invisible Me" – 4:14
 "Little Boy Don't Lose Your Balls" – 1:20
 "David Gower" (hidden track) – 0:54

Personnel

Musicians
 Paul Kelly - guitar, harmonica, vocals,
 Michael Barclay - percussion, drums, vocals
 Peter Bull - accordion, keyboards
 Paul Burton - bass
 Steve Connolly - guitar, vocals
 Ray Pereira - percussion, cardboard box
 Jon Schofield - bass, vocals
 Ian Simpson - guitar, banjo, mandolin, pedal steel
 Kaarin Fairfax - vocals
 Shelagh Hannan - vocals

Production details
 Produced by Alan Thorne and Paul Kelly
 Engineered by Alan Thorne, assisted by David Mackie and Tristin Norwell
 Recorded & mixed at Trafalgar Studio, Sydney

Charts

References

1991 albums
Paul Kelly (Australian musician) albums
Mushroom Records albums